Simla Youngs Football Club was an Indian football club from New Delhi. Formed in 1936, it has been an amateur team, but in January 2011 they participated in the 2nd Division, then second tier of Indian football league system. They also competed in the DSA Senior Division.

History
Simla Youngs FC was founded in 1936 in Simla part of Delhi, and have since participated in various amateur tournaments.

In January 2011, they were officially certified by the All India Football Federation to participate in the I-League 2nd Division, then second tier of football in India. They later roped in Japanese manager Michiteru Mita as their new head coach.

Honours

League
Delhi Football League
Champions (6): 1950, 1952, 1972, 1973, 1976, 2005
Runner-up (3): 1985, 1991, 1993

Cup
Lal Bahadur Shastri Cup
Champions (2): 1979, 1985

See also
List of football clubs in Delhi

References

External links
 Simla Youngs website

Football clubs in New Delhi
Association football clubs established in 1936
1936 establishments in India